
Otto Heidkämper (13 March 1901 – 17 February 1969) was a German general during World War II who commanded several divisions. During the invasion of France he served as Ia or Chief of Staff to Erwin Rommel and his 7th Panzer Division.  He was a recipient of the Knight's Cross of the Iron Cross of Nazi Germany.

Awards and decorations

 Knight's Cross of the Iron Cross on 8 February 1943 as Oberst i.G. and Chef des Generalstabes XXIV. Panzerkorps

References

Citations

Bibliography

 

1901 births
1969 deaths
People from Schaumburg
Lieutenant generals of the German Army (Wehrmacht)
German Army personnel of World War I
Recipients of the clasp to the Iron Cross, 2nd class
Recipients of the Gold German Cross
Recipients of the Knight's Cross of the Iron Cross
German prisoners of war in World War II held by the United States
People from Schaumburg-Lippe
Military personnel from Lower Saxony